Oratosquilla fabricii is a species of mantis shrimp found in the Indo-Pacific. Like other members of its order it has a powerful spear, which it uses to hunt invertebrates and small fish.

Reproduction and life cycle 
Some members of the order Stomatopoda pair for life and some come together only to mate. Males produce sperm ducts rather than spermatophores; females can brood a maximum of 50,000 eggs. Life cycle: Eggs hatch to a planktonic zoea which lasts for 3 months.

References

Stomatopoda
Crustaceans described in 1941
Crustaceans of the Pacific Ocean
Crustaceans of the Indian Ocean